Sliding block may refer to:

 sliding-block action
 sliding-block puzzle